Helicobacter canis is a bacterium in the Helicobacteraceae family, Campylobacterales order. Its type strain is NCTC 12739T. It colonises the lower bowel, but is also present in cases of hepatitis. Besides infecting dogs, this bacterium is known to cause infections in immunocompromised humans.

Description
Cells of H. canis are spiral, sometimes with truncated ends. Flagella are single and bipolar, as well as sheathed, a characteristic of genus Helicobacter, and connected to a basal plate at their insertion into the cell.

References

Further reading

External links
bacterio.cict.fr entry
Type strain of Helicobacter canis at BacDive -  the Bacterial Diversity Metadatabase

Campylobacterota
Bacteria described in 1993